Vinícius Ferreira de Souza (born 2 December 1988) is a Brazilian footballer and former football player who plays for Indian club Delhi Dynamos FC as an attacking midfielder.

Career
Born in Campinas, São Paulo, Vinícius moved to Fortaleza, Ceará at early age and was a Ceará SC youth player, but moved on to footvolley in 2008. With the latter sport he was considered one of the best players worldwide, along with his partner Bello, and was crowned champions of more than 30 championships.

On 30 September 2015 Vinícius was drafted by Indian Super League side Delhi Dynamos FC, after being recommended by compatriot Roberto Carlos. He made his professional debut on 4 October, starting in a 0–2 away loss against FC Goa.

References

External links
ISL profile

1988 births
Living people
Sportspeople from Fortaleza
Brazilian footballers
Association football midfielders
Indian Super League players
Odisha FC players
Brazilian expatriate footballers
Brazilian expatriate sportspeople in India
Expatriate footballers in India